Sefton Rugby Union Football Club is an amateur rugby union team who are based in Liverpool, England. Sefton, is the oldest established Rugby Union Club in Liverpool. Situated in the West Derby district of the city, the Club can now claim to field sides from all age groups most weeks of the season.

Current squad

Location

Sefton RUFC Is located on Thornhead lane in the West Derby area of Liverpool Just of Leyfield Road. The clubhouse has had a lot of work done to it in recent years. Most notably including the installation of a brand new kitchen and flooring throughout the changing rooms. The club also has its own carpark that is capable of holding all the cars visiting on busy match days. Sefton has three rugby pitches that are maintained throughout the year. currently two of those pitches are equipped with full pitch flood lights and there are plans to get the third pitch flood lit too. Sefton's 1XV pitch has had a lot of time and money invested into it, In 2010 receiving a drainage system to help prevent any waterlogged games. The pitch also has a stand for supporters/substitutions/coaches which all-in-all makes this pitch possibly the best in the league.

Club honours
South Lancs/Cheshire 2 champions (2): 1992–93, 2012–13

Notes

English rugby union teams
Sport in the Metropolitan Borough of Sefton
Rugby clubs established in 1907
1907 establishments in England